Walter Biere (fl. 1393–1407), of Gold Hill, Shaftesbury, Dorset, was an English Member of Parliament.

He was a Member (MP) of the Parliament of England for Shaftesbury in 1393, 1395, January 1397, September 1397, 1399, 1402, 1410, May 1413, November 1414 and 1417. He was Mayor of Shaftesbury Michaelmas in 1392–93, 1401–02 and 1404–1406.

References

14th-century births
15th-century deaths
English MPs 1395
People from Shaftesbury
Mayors of Shaftesbury
English MPs 1393
English MPs January 1397
English MPs September 1397
English MPs 1399
English MPs 1402
English MPs 1410
English MPs May 1413
English MPs November 1414
English MPs 1417